Ana Lelas (born 2 April 1983) is a Croatian professional basketball player. She plays for the national team of Croatia and Trešnjevka 2009 of Croatia. She has represented the national team in several Eurobasket Women competitions and represented the country at the 2012 Summer Olympics.

References

External links
Profile at eurobasket.com

1983 births
Living people
Basketball players from Split, Croatia
Croatian women's basketball players
Basketball players at the 2012 Summer Olympics
Olympic basketball players of Croatia
Croatian Women's Basketball League players
Small forwards
Mediterranean Games gold medalists for Croatia
Mediterranean Games medalists in basketball
Competitors at the 2001 Mediterranean Games